Yedidya Ya'ari (born 30 June 1947) was the commander of the Israeli Navy from 2000 to 2004. He was succeeded by David Ben Ba'ashat.

Biography
Ya'ari is the grandson of Meir Ya'ari, former leader of the Mapam party. He is the father of three and lives in Merhavia.

Navy career
In July 1969, as a  commando in Shayetet 13, he was badly wounded and mistakenly declared dead during Operation Bulmus 6, the assault on fortified Green Island, Egypt, in the Gulf of Suez (jointly with Sayeret Matkal).

Photography career
After retiring from active army service, Ya'ari worked as an assistant cameraman for three years at Herzliya Studios.

Business career
He was CEO of Rafael Advanced Defense Systems Ltd. In 2016, he became president of GenCell, an Israel-based fuel cell developer and manufacturer.

References

Israeli Navy generals
1947 births
Living people
Officers of the Legion of Merit